Violet Hardisty Grantham (15 February 1893 – 20 May 1983) was a British politician, the first woman to serve as Lord Mayor of Newcastle-upon-Tyne.

Born Violet Taylor, she was educated privately, and married John Grantham, who served as Lord Mayor of Newcastle in 1936/37.  In addition to being his Lady Mayoress, Violet served on the boards of a number of local organisations, and in 1937 she was elected to Newcastle City Council in her own right, representing the Conservative Party.  In 1950/51, she became the first woman to serve as Sheriff of Newcastle-upon-Tyne, and was elected as an alderman of Newcastle City Council in 1951.  In 1952/53, she was the first woman to serve as Lord Mayor of Newcastle-upon-Tyne, and she held the post again in 1957.  She again became an elected councillor in 1958, and served until the reorganisation of local government in 1974, when she retired.

References

1893 births
1983 deaths
Conservative Party (UK) councillors
Mayors of Newcastle upon Tyne
Women councillors in England
Women mayors of places in England